Dunasziget is a village in Győr-Moson-Sopron county, Hungary, with 1477 inhabitants. Dunansziget is on the Szigetköz island, which reaches to the Slovak border.

History
The town of Dunasziget was first mentioned in the 18th century, at that time consisting of three villages named Cikolasziget, Doborgazsziget and Sérfenyősziget. During a flood in 1954, the inhabitants had to be evacuated and most parts of the village have been destroyed and therefore were rebuilt. In 1969, the three villages were combined to form Dunasziget.

Politics 
The mayor is Benjamin Csaba Cseh. The sister city is Forstinning in Bavaria, Germany.

Economy and infrastructure

Agriculture and tourism 
The economy in Dunasziget is characterized by small farms, but also several businesses in the field of tourism such as guest houses, boat rentals and campgrounds. The floodplain forest of the Danube river, which surrounds the village, offers various recreational activities like canoeing, fishing and observing the wildlife.

Education 
In Dunasziget are a kindergarten and an elementary school. The Timaffy-Endre elementary school was founded in the 19th century and nowadays has eight classes with 66 students total.

Culture and sights 

 Roman Catholic Church of Sacred Heart of Jesus
 Millenium Memorial
 Bathing beach
 Floodplain Forests

References

External links 

  
 Street map 

Populated places in Győr-Moson-Sopron County